Hawick Burghs was a district of burghs constituency of the House of Commons of the Parliament of the United Kingdom from 1868 until 1918. It consisted of the Roxburghshire burgh of Hawick and the Selkirkshire burghs of Galashiels and Selkirk.

Members of Parliament

Election results

George Otto Trevelyan was returned without opposition at the 1868 general election and again after acceptance of office at a by-election on 14 January 1869.

Elections in the 1860s

Trevelyan was appointed Civil Lord of the Admiralty.

Elections in the 1870s

Elections in the 1880s

Trevelyan was appointed Chief Secretary to the Lord Lieutenant of Ireland, requiring a by-election.

Trevelyan was appointed Secretary of State for Scotland, requiring a by-election.

Elections in the 1890s

Shaw was appointed Solicitor-General for Scotland, requiring a by-election.

Elections in the 1900s

Elections in the 1910s

General Election 1914–15:

Another General Election was required to take place before the end of 1915. The political parties had been making preparations for an election to take place and by the July 1914, the following candidates had been selected; 
Liberal: John Barran
Unionist: Norman W. Grieve

References

Historic parliamentary constituencies in Scotland (Westminster)
Constituencies of the Parliament of the United Kingdom established in 1868
Constituencies of the Parliament of the United Kingdom disestablished in 1918
Hawick